Otunba Adewunmi Oriyomi Onanuga (born December 2, 1965), popularly known as Yomi Onanuga, is a Nigerian politician and entrepreneur who is a member of the Nigerian 9th National Assembly. She was born in Hammersmith, London to Nigerian parents.

Politics

In 2019, Otunba Adewunmi Onanuga  contested election for Member, House of Representatives, Representing Ikenne/Sagamu/Remo North  Federal Constituency in Ogun state Nigeria on the platform of the Nigeria's governing party All Progressive Congress (APC), won and sworn in as Member of the 9th National Assembly. She is chairperson house committee on women affairs and social development.

References 

Living people
Yoruba politicians
1965 births
All Progressives Congress politicians